Sandra Casber Wise (born July 3, 1946) is an American attorney and the wife of former Governor of West Virginia Bob Wise of West Virginia. During her husband's term as governor, Wise was the First Lady of West Virginia.

Early life and education 
She was born in Minneapolis, Minnesota on July 3, 1946. She earned a degree in political science from Macalester College and a J.D. degree from the University of Minnesota Law School.

Career 
While working as staff attorney with the United States House Committee on Ways and Means in the early-1980s, she met her future husband, Bob Wise. They married on July 28, 1984. While first lady, she traveled around the state to promote child literacy and to combat underage drinking.

References

1946 births
Living people
University of Minnesota Law School alumni
First Ladies and Gentlemen of West Virginia
Lawyers from Minneapolis
West Virginia lawyers
21st-century American women